Sumedha College (Sinhala: සුමේධ විද්‍යාලය)  (also referred to as Sumedha College Gampaha) is a Sri Lankan Government approved Semi Government School located in Gampaha, Sri Lanka. Sumedha College provides primary and secondary education to more than 4,000+ students (both girls & boys)  from ages 5 to 19,

Sumedha College was established in 2003 with twenty students and two teachers. The school follows the government syllabuses.

Students of the college are known as Sumedhians, whilst past pupils are known as Old Sumedhians.

Past Principals

House System 
The students are divided into four houses:

References

Schools in Gampaha